The Zambia national netball team represent Zambia in international netball competition, and are governed by the Netball Association of Zambia (NAZ). Zambia won their first international medal when they placed third at the 2011 All-Africa Games in Mozambique. In 2012, they won silver at the Confederation of African Netball Associations (CANA) tournament in Zanzibar, bronze at the COSANA Africa Cup in Tanzania and another bronze at the Diamond Challenge in South Africa.

Zambia made their debut on the INF World Rankings in October 2012, placing 22nd. As of 21 July 2019, they are ranked 15th in the world, and 5th in Africa. Charles Zulu was appointed head coach of the Zambian team in April 2012, replacing Davies Twininge.

Players

2015 Zambia Netball World Cup Team

Competitive record

References

National netball teams of Africa
Netball